The Government of Pridnestrovian Moldavian Republic is the political leadership of the unrecognized, but de facto independent, Pridnestrovian Moldavian Republic, better known in English as Transnistria.

Executive branch

The institute of government and the post of Prime minister of Transnistria were introduced on January 1, 2012 in accordance with the amendments made to the Transdniestrian Constitution in June 2011. Until January 1, 2012, the PMR Cabinet of Ministers formed the presidential powers as the head of the executive power of the republic. The ministers were directly subordinate to the head of the Transnistrian state. In accordance with the amendments, the supreme executive authority of the PMR becomes a government composed of the chairman of the PMR government, his deputies, ministers, and heads of state administrations of cities and regions.

The government of the PMR operates on the basis of the PMR Constitution, constitutional laws and laws of the PMR, as well as the legal acts of the President of the PMR. Based on the Constitution of Transnistria, the Government exercises the following powers:

- develops and submits to the Supreme Council of the PMR a draft republican budget and ensures its implementation;

- submits to the Supreme Council a report on the execution of the republican budget;

- submits to the Supreme Council annual reports on the results of its activities, including on issues raised by the Supreme Council;

- ensures the implementation of a unified state policy in the field of culture, science, education, health care, social welfare, ecology;

- carries out measures to ensure the defense of the country, state security, organizes the implementation of domestic and foreign policy of the state;

- takes measures to ensure the rule of law, the rights and freedoms of citizens, protect property and public order, combat crime;

- realizes other powers assigned to it by the Constitution of the Pridnestrovian Moldavian Republic, laws, decrees of the President of Transnistria.

Current cabinet

Source:

Legislative branch

The Supreme Council or Supreme Soviet is the parliament of the Pridnestrovian Moldavian Republic.

See also
Government of Moldova
Politics of Transnistria
Politics of Moldova

External links
 Government of the Pridnestrovian Moldavian Republic. Official site

References

 
Politics of Transnistria
Political organizations based in Transnistria
Transnistria